Shoma Sato (born 8 February 2001) is a Japanese swimmer. He competed in the 2020 Summer Olympics.

References

2001 births
Living people
Sportspeople from Tokyo
Swimmers at the 2020 Summer Olympics
Japanese male breaststroke swimmers
Olympic swimmers of Japan
21st-century Japanese people